Ytterbium compounds are chemical compounds that contain the element ytterbium (Yb). The chemical behavior of ytterbium is similar to that of the rest of the lanthanides. Most ytterbium compounds are found in the +3 oxidation state, and its salts in this oxidation state are nearly colorless. Like europium, samarium, and thulium, the trihalides of ytterbium can be reduced to the dihalides by hydrogen, zinc dust, or by the addition of metallic ytterbium. The +2 oxidation state occurs only in solid compounds and reacts in some ways similarly to the alkaline earth metal compounds; for example, ytterbium(II) oxide (YbO) shows the same structure as calcium oxide (CaO).

Halides 

Ytterbium forms both dihalides and trihalides with the halogens fluorine, chlorine, bromine, and iodine. The dihalides are susceptible to oxidation to the trihalides at room temperature and disproportionate to the trihalides and metallic ytterbium at high temperature:

3 YbX2 → 2 YbX3 + Yb (X = F, Cl, Br, I)

Some ytterbium halides are used as reagents in organic synthesis. For example, ytterbium(III) chloride (YbCl3) is a Lewis acid and can be used as a catalyst in the Aldol and Diels–Alder reactions. Ytterbium(II) iodide (YbI2) may be used, like samarium(II) iodide, as a reducing agent for coupling reactions. Ytterbium(III) fluoride (YbF3) is used as an inert and non-toxic tooth filling as it continuously releases fluoride ions, which are good for dental health, and is also a good X-ray contrast agent.

Oxides 

Ytterbium reacts with oxygen to form ytterbium(III) oxide (Yb2O3), which crystallizes in the "rare-earth C-type sesquioxide" structure which is related to the fluorite structure with one quarter of the anions removed, leading to ytterbium atoms in two different six coordinate (non-octahedral) environments. Ytterbium(III) oxide can be reduced to ytterbium(II) oxide (YbO) with elemental ytterbium, which crystallizes in the same structure as sodium chloride.

Borides 

Ytterbium dodecaboride (YbB12) is a crystalline material that has been studied to understand various electronic and structural properties of many chemically related substances. It is a Kondo insulator. It is a quantum material; under normal conditions, the interior of the bulk crystal is an insulator whereas the surface is highly conductive. Among the rare earth elements, ytterbium is one of the few that can form a stable dodecaboride, a property attributed to its comparatively small atomic radius.

Other inorganic compounds 

Ytterbium(III) nitrate is the nitrate of ytterbium in the +3 oxidation state. The compound forms colorless crystals, dissolves in water, and also forms crystalline hydrates. It can be obtained by reacting ytterbium and nitric oxide in ethyl acetate:

 Yb + 3 N2O4 → Yb(NO3)3 + 3 H2O

Ytterbium phosphide is the phosphide of ytterbium in the +3 oxidation state. It can be obtained by reacting ytterbium and phosphine in liquid ammonia to form Yb(PH2)2·5NH3, which can be decomposed to obtain ytterbium phosphide:

Yb(PH2)2•5NH3 → Yb(PH2)2 + 5NH3

2Yb(PH2)2 → YbP + 2PH3 + H2

The compound forms black crystals of a cubic system, space group Fm3m.

Ytterbium(III) acetate is an the acetate of ytterbium in the +3 oxidation state. It has colorless crystals that are soluble in water and can form hydrates. Ytterbium acetate can be used as a raw material for the synthesis of upconversion luminescent materials；it can also be used as a catalyst for some specific organic reactions.

Alloys

Ytterbium dirhodium disilicide 

Ytterbium dirhodium disilicide (YbRh2Si2), also abbreviated YRS, is a heavy fermion solid state compound of ytterbium, rhodium and silicon. It becomes superconducting when cooled to 2 mK. Just above this temperature the heat capacity is extremely high, and the electrons behave as if they were 1,000,000 times heavier than they really are.

Ytterbium-bismuth-platinum 

Ytterbium-bismuth-platinum is an intermetallic material which at low temperatures exhibits an extremely high value of specific heat, which is a characteristic of heavy-fermion behavior. 
Ytterbium-bismuth-platinum has a noncentrosymmetric cubic crystal structure; in particular it belongs to the ternary half-Heusler compounds.

Ytterbium-gallium-germanium 

Ytterbium-gallium-germanium (also called YbGaGe) is an alloy of ytterbium, gallium and germanium. It sparked interest because one group of researchers reported that it exhibits zero thermal expansion, while being conductive. Such materials have applications in space and other environments where low thermal expansion materials are required. However, subsequent measurements by other groups were not able to reproduce those results, but rather found expansion coefficients similar to copper.

See also 

 Thulium compounds
 Lutetium compounds

References 

Ytterbium compounds
Ytterbium
Chemical compounds by element